The Carlsbad Unified School District is the school district for Carlsbad, California, USA. The Superintendent is Dr. Benjamin Churchill.  The district manages two high schools, three middle schools and nine elementary schools. In addition they operate two alternative schools.

Schools

High schools
 Carlsbad High School (CHS)
 Sage Creek High School

Middle schools
 Aviara Oaks Middle School (AOMS)
 Calavera Hills Middle School
 Valley Middle School

Elementary schools
 Aviara Oaks Elementary School (AOE)
 Buena Vista Elementary School
 Calavera Hills Elementary School
 Hope Elementary School
 Jefferson Elementary School
 Kelly Elementary School
 Magnolia Elementary School
 Pacific Rim Elementary School
 Poinsettia Elementary School

Alternative schools
 Carlsbad Village Academy
 Carlsbad Seaside Academy

2010 shooting
On October 8, 2010, Brendan O'Rourke, 41, jumped over a fence and opened fire with a revolver on the playground of Kelly Elementary School. Two girls, 6 and 7, were grazed in the arms. A construction worker then knocked the shooter down with his truck. O'Rourke was sentenced to 168 years to life in prison on multiple charges of attempted premeditated murder and assault.

References

External links
 

School districts in San Diego County, California
Carlsbad, California